On February 28, 2023, an oil tanker registered under the name MT Princess Empress sank off the coast of Naujan, Oriental Mindoro, Philippines, causing a widespread oil spill into the Tablas Strait that has reached as far as the provinces of Antique and Palawan. The oil tanker, en route from Bataan to Iloilo, was carrying 900,000 liters of industrial oil prior to its sinking.

Background
MT Princess Empress, the oil tanker that caused the oil spill, is owned by RDC Reield Marine Services. Before it sank, the oil tanker was crewed by 20 people and en route to Iloilo to transport  of industrial fuel oil from SL Gas Harbor Terminal in Limay, Bataan. According to an energy sector source, industrial fuel oil, also known as "black oil", is "highly toxic to the environment".

The Tablas Strait, where the oil spill occured, is a waterway between the islands of Mindoro, Marinduque, Panay, and Tablas that serves as a major shipping route in the Philippines. The strait and its adjacent waterbodies, including the Verde Island Passage, are one of the most biodiverse in the country. At least 21 marine protected areas could be affected by the oil spill according to the Department of Environment and Natural Resources (DENR). Moreover, residents of the coastal settlements of Oriental Mindoro and nearby provinces rely on fishing and other marine activities for their livelihood.

Sinking and oil spill
At 4:16 a.m. Philippine Standard Time (UTC+8) on February 28, 2023, MT Princess Empress was reported to be half-submerged in the waters of Naujan, Oriental Mindoro, after experiencing an engine trouble. Four minutes later, MV Efes, a foreign vessel, rescued the oil tanker's crew and took them to Subic, Zambales, where they arrived by 6 p.m. unscathed. By 8 a.m., the oil tanker had fully sunk and drifted towards Balingawan Point after facing rough sea conditions. Later that day,  and a helicopter were dispatched by the Philippine Coast Guard (PCG) to investigate the area. A five-kilometer-long and 500-meter-wide oil spill was then discovered near the shipwreck, although the coast guard clarified that it was from the diesel fuel used to power the tanker, not the industrial fuel oil it was carrying.

On March 1, the oil spill expanded to around six by four kilometers. The coast guard described its slick as "black and thick, with strong odor". The oil had thinner particles as compared with the diesel fuel from the tanker, which caused an initial oil spill. At around 2 pm, MTUG Titan – a tugboat carrying oil spill recovery equipment and members of the Marine Environmental Protection Unit (MEPU) of the PCG, the Environmental Management Bureau (EMB) of the DENR, and Malayan Towage and Salvage Corporation (MTSC) – reached the oil spill area and began spraying oil dispersants.

Impact

The oil spill has affected nine municipalities in Oriental Mindoro: Naujan, Pola, Pinamalayan, Gloria, Basud, Bongabong, Roxas, Mansalay and Bulalacao; one in Antique: Caluya; and two in Palawan: Taytay and Agutaya. The Department of Social Welfare and Development (DSWD) estimated that more than 137,000 individuals have been affected by the oil spill. In Oriental Mindoro alone, more than 99,000 people have been affected. 122 of whom have fallen ill, with some experiencing respiratory-related symptoms, vomiting, diarrhea, dizziness, eye irritation, and fever.

Response
RDC Reield Marine Services, the owner of MT Princess Empress, hired two contractors—Harbor Star Shipping Services and Malayan Towage and Salvage Corporation—to help with their cleanup efforts.

See also
Guimaras oil spill

Notes

References

External links
Official website dedicated to the sinking of MT Princess Empress
Effects of Oil Spill in Mimaropa and Region VI (Western Visayas) by the National Disaster Risk Reduction and Management Council (NDRRMC)
MT Princess Empress oil spill updates by the Department of Environment and Natural Resources (DENR)

2023 disasters in the Philippines
2023 in the environment
2023 industrial disasters
February 2023 events in the Philippines
March 2023 events in the Philippines
Maritime incidents in 2023
Maritime incidents in the Philippines
Oil spills in Asia
Shipwrecks in the Pacific Ocean
History of Oriental Mindoro